Gennady Strakhov (1 November 1944 – 30 December 2020) was a Russian wrestler who competed in the 1972 Summer Olympics.

Strakhov died from COVID-19 in Moscow on 30 December 2020, during the COVID-19 pandemic in Russia. He was 76.

References

1944 births
2020 deaths
Olympic wrestlers of the Soviet Union
Wrestlers at the 1972 Summer Olympics
Russian male sport wrestlers
Olympic silver medalists for the Soviet Union
Olympic medalists in wrestling
Medalists at the 1972 Summer Olympics
Deaths from the COVID-19 pandemic in Russia